The Mae Klong Dam is a barrage dam on the Mae Klong River in western  Thailand's Kanchanaburi Province. Situated in Tha Muang District, shortly downstream of the provincial capital of Kanchanaburi, it was built as part of the Greater Mae Klong Irrigation Project and was completed in 1970.

The barrage is a steel-reinforced concrete structure, 150 metres long and 14 metres high, with eight 12.5-by-7.5-metre radial gates. A small hydroelectric power plant with two 6-megawatt generators was built in 2006. The dam is jointly operated the Royal Irrigation Department and the Electricity Generating Authority of Thailand.

Mae Klong Dam produced 33.32 GWh in 2014. The targeted annual supply was set at 74 GWh, and experiments have demonstrated that the dam is capable of producing up to 124.39 GWh.

References

Dams in Thailand
Barrages (dam)
Buildings and structures in Kanchanaburi province
Dams completed in 1970
1970 establishments in Thailand